Alexander Joseph William Rackow (born 25 December 1996) is an English former first-class cricketer. He made 4 First Class appearances between 2017 and 2019.

Early life and career 
Rackow was born at Wandsworth in December 1996. He was educated at Dulwich College (2010-15), before going up to St Hilda's College, Oxford (2016-19).  While studying at Oxford, Rackow made three appearances in first-class cricket for Oxford University against Cambridge University in The University Matches of 2017, 2018 and 2019.  He scored 218 runs in his three matches, averaging 54.50. He made two half centuries, with a high score of 95.  He gained three cricketing blues, captaining the blues in his final year and was the first Old Alleynian since Bill Mitchell to gain an Oxford blue in cricket.  In addition to playing for Oxford University, Rackow also made a single first-class appearance for Oxford MCCU against Kent in 2018 at Canterbury. 

Rackow is currently training to become a solicitor.

Notes and references

External links

 

1996 births
Living people
People from Wandsworth
People educated at Dulwich College
Alumni of St Hilda's College, Oxford
English cricketers
Oxford University cricketers
Oxford MCCU cricketers
English solicitors